Stephen Robert Jenkins (born 16 July 1972) is a former Wales international footballer. A full back, he won 16 Welsh caps between 1995 and 2001.

He began his career at Swansea, where he was a part of the team that won the 1994 Football League Trophy Final after a penalty shootout. After a seven-year spell at Huddersfield Town, in which he became not only the captain but a well established fans' favourite, Jenkins signed for Swindon Town in 2005, but after Swindon's relegation to League Two and the appointment of Dennis Wise as manager, Jenkins' offer of a new deal at the County Ground was withdrawn and he was released. He spent three years playing for and latterly coaching Newport County, before joining Llanelli as player/assistant manager to Andy Legg in May 2009.

In June 2013 Jenkins was appointed manager of Monmouth Town.

On 20 March 2014 Jenkins was appointed assistant manager to Peter Beadle at Hereford United. Hereford ended the 2013–14 season in 20th place, finishing above the relegation zone on goal difference after beating Aldershot Town on the final day of the season.

On 23 May 2014, Jenkins was appointed as manager of his home town club Merthyr Town.

On 30 May 2016, Jenkins was confirmed as Hereford's assistant manager. He left the role on 13 September 2018.

On 4 September 2020, Jenkins joined Barnet, once again as assistant to Beadle. He left the club on 18 December, shortly after Beadle's departure.

References

External links

1972 births
Living people
Footballers from Merthyr Tydfil
Welsh footballers
Wales international footballers
Association football defenders
Swansea City A.F.C. players
Huddersfield Town A.F.C. players
Birmingham City F.C. players
Cardiff City F.C. players
Worcester City F.C. players
Newport County A.F.C. players
Notts County F.C. players
Peterborough United F.C. players
Swindon Town F.C. players
Llanelli Town A.F.C. players
English Football League players
Welsh football managers
Merthyr Town F.C. managers
Barnet F.C. non-playing staff